Kingman Academy of Learning (often shortened to Kingman Academy or KAOL) is a public charter school in Kingman, Arizona for preschool grades through high school. It consists of four campuses with a total enrollment of approximately 1,500 students. It is a member of the Arizona Interscholastic Association. The school was founded in 1995 for preschool to 6th grade. It expanded to include high school with its initial 9th grade class in 2001.

The high school's Academic Decathlon program won two years (2010 and 2011) of state titles for the northern Arizona region, which broke the 23-year-running winning streak of St. Johns High School.

The Kingman Academy of Learning was founded by Mrs. Betty Rowe. The executive director is Mrs. Susan Chan. There are four campuses.

References

External links
 Official website
 High school adjunct website

Public K-12 schools in the United States
Public high schools in Arizona
Schools in Mohave County, Arizona
Educational institutions established in 1995
Charter schools in Arizona
Public elementary schools in Arizona
Public middle schools in Arizona
Buildings and structures in Kingman, Arizona
1995 establishments in Arizona